The 2020 United States House of Representatives elections in Oregon was held on November 3, 2020, to elect the five U.S. representatives from the state of Oregon, one from each of the state's five congressional districts. The elections coincided with the 2020 U.S. presidential election, as well as other elections to the House of Representatives, elections to the United States Senate and various state and local elections.

Overview 
The Democratic and Republican parties held their primaries on May 19, 2020. Oregon's other parties held their primaries at various dates until August 25, 2020.

District 1

The 1st district is located in northwestern Oregon and takes in the western Portland metro area, including the Portland suburbs of Beaverton and Hillsboro. The incumbent is Democrat Suzanne Bonamici, who was re-elected with 63.6% of the vote in 2018.

Democratic primary

Candidates

Declared
Ricky Barajas, candidate for Oregon's 1st congressional district in 2018
Suzanne Bonamici, incumbent U.S. Representative
Heidi Briones, insurance agent and universal basic income advocate
Amanda Siebe, disability rights activist

Endorsements

Primary results

Republican primary

Candidates

Declared
Christopher Christensen, small business owner
Armidia "Army" Murray, former UPS worker

Withdrawn
Laura Curtis, small business owner (withdrew on March 9, 2020)

Primary results

General election

Predictions

Results

District 2

The 2nd district, the geographically largest of Oregon's six districts, covers roughly two-thirds of the state east of the Cascades, encompassing the central, eastern, and southern regions of the state, including Bend and Medford. The incumbent was Republican Greg Walden, who was re-elected with 56.3% of the vote in 2018. On October 28, 2019, Walden announced that he would not seek re-election.

Republican primary

Candidates

Declared
Jason Atkinson, former state legislator representing Oregon's 2nd Senate district and Oregon's 51st House district, candidate for Governor of Oregon in 2006
Cliff Bentz, former state senator representing Oregon's 30th Senate district
Knute Buehler, former state representative and nominee for Governor of Oregon in 2018
David Campbell, project manager
HG Carey, Jr., railroad executive
Jimmy Crumpacker, investor
Travis Fager, radio business operator
Justin Livingston, Bend city councilor
Ken Medenbach, activist and participant in the 2016 Occupation of the Malheur National Wildlife Refuge
Mark Roberts, online retailer and Independent candidate for Oregon's 2nd congressional district in 2018
Jeff Smith, small business owner, candidate for Governor in 2018

Declined
Herman Baertschiger Jr., state senate minority leader
Daniel Bonham, state representative
Jason Conger, former state representative
Tim Knopp, state senator
Mike McLane, Jefferson & Crook County Circuit Court Judge & Former state house Minority Leader
Greg Walden, incumbent U.S. Representative

Endorsements

Primary results

Democratic primary

Candidates

Declared
Nik Heuertz, small business owner
John Holm, caregiver
Jack Howard, attorney and former Union County commissioner
Alex Spenser, activist and writer
Chris Vaughn, sales representative

Withdrawn
Raz Mason, political activist and candidate for Oregon's 2nd congressional district in 2018 (withdrawal effective January 1, 2020, her campaign strategist Alex Spenser will continue her campaign)
Isabella Tibbetts, community organizer (withdrawal effective March 12, 2020)

Declined
Jamie McLeod-Skinner, environmental attorney and nominee for Oregon's 2nd congressional district in 2018 (running for Oregon Secretary of State)
Jennifer Naehring, physician

Endorsements

Primary results

General election

Endorsements

Predictions

Results

District 3

The 3rd district encompasses the eastern Portland metro area, taking in Portland and Gresham. The incumbent is Democrat Earl Blumenauer, who was re-elected with 72.6% of the vote in 2018. Running against him for the Republican Party was Joanna Harbour, while the Green Party candidate was author and civil rights activist Alex DiBlasi.

Democratic primary

Candidates

Declared
Charles Rand Barnett, candidate for Oregon's 3rd congressional district in 2018
Earl Blumenauer, incumbent U.S. Representative
Matthew Davis, businessman
Albert Lee, civic activist and dean of the Business and Computing division at Portland Community College

Endorsements

Primary results

Republican primary

Candidates

Declared
Joanna Harbour, attorney
Tom Harrison, nominee for Oregon's 3rd congressional district in 2018
Frank Hecker, former US Naval officer

Primary results

General election

Predictions

Results

District 4

The 4th district takes in the southern Willamette Valley and the South Coast, including Eugene, Corvallis, and Roseburg. The incumbent is Democrat Peter DeFazio, who was re-elected with 56.0% of the vote in 2018.

Democratic primary

Candidates

Declared
Doyle Canning, community organizer
Peter DeFazio, incumbent U.S. Representative

Withdrawn
Cassidy A Clausen, healthcare worker (withdrawal effective March 12, 2020)

Endorsements

Primary results

Republican primary

Candidates

Declared
Nelson Ijih, engineer
Alek Skarlatos, former Oregon National Guard soldier

Withdrawn
Jo Rae Perkins, former Chairwoman of the Linn County Republican Party and perennial candidate and supporter of the QAnon conspiracy theory. (nominee for U.S. Senate)
Art Robinson, chemist, former Chair of the Oregon Republican Party, global warming and evolution denialist and perennial candidate (running for State Senate)

Endorsements

Primary results

General election

Predictions

Results

District 5

The 5th district straddles the central coast, and includes Salem and the southern Portland suburbs. The incumbent is Democrat Kurt Schrader, who was re-elected with 55.0% of the vote in 2018.

Democratic primary

Candidates

Declared
Mark Gamba, mayor of Milwaukie
Blair Reynolds, entrepreneur
Kurt Schrader, incumbent U.S. Representative

Endorsements

Primary results

Republican primary

Candidates

Declared
Shane Dinkel, computer trainer
Joey Nations, tax policy analyst
Angela Roman, businesswoman
Amy Ryan Courser, former Keizer city councilor, businesswoman & community volunteer

Endorsements

Primary results

General election

Predictions

Results

References

External links
 
 
  (State affiliate of the U.S. League of Women Voters)
 

Official campaign websites for 1st district candidates
 Suzanne Bonamici (D) for Congress
 Christopher Christensen (R) for Congress 

Official campaign websites for 2nd district candidates
 Cliff Bentz (R) for Congress
 Alex Spenser (D) for Congress

Official campaign websites for 3rd district candidates
 Earl Blumenauer (D) for Congress
 Joanna Harbour (R) for Congress 

Official campaign websites for 4th district candidates
 Peter DeFazio (D) for Congress
 Alek Skarlatos (R) for Congress

Official campaign websites for 5th district candidates
 Amy Ryan Courser (R) for Congress
 Kurt Schrader (D) for Congress

2020
Oregon
United States House of Representatives